"All or Nothing" is a song recorded by American boy band O-Town. The pop ballad was written by Wayne Hector and Steve Mac, and produced by Mac. It was released on March 20, 2001, as the second single from their debut album, O-Town (2001). The song reached number three in the United States, number five in Canada, and number four in the United Kingdom.

In 2006, Irish boy band Westlife recorded a cover version on their seventh studio album, The Love Album—to which was used extensively as background music during the audition stages of The X Factor UK. The song itself charted without being properly released as a single in the United Kingdom. Westlife later revealed that the song was first offered to them but Simon Cowell, their executive producer, rejected it and passed it on to O-Town, becoming their hit. Rolling Stone ranked the song as the 32nd best boy band song of all time.

Composition
The song is performed in the key of C major in common time with a tempo of 64 beats per minute then modulates to D major after the bridge. The group's vocals span from G4 to A5.

Track listings
UK CD1
 "All or Nothing" (Radio Mix)
 "All or Nothing" (Rizzo Radio Edit)

UK CD2
 "All or Nothing" (Radio Mix)
 "All or Nothing" (HQ2 Radio Mix)
 "Liquid Dreams" (Matrix Mix)
 "All or Nothing" (Music Video)

Europe CD-maxi
 "All or Nothing" (Radio Mix)
 "All or Nothing" (Rizzo Club Mix)
 "All or Nothing" (HQ2 Mixshow Mix)
 "Take Me Under" (Live Version)
 "Baby I Would"

US CD single
 "All or Nothing" (Radio Mix)
 "All or Nothing" (HQ2 Radio Mix)
 "All or Nothing" (Rizzo Radio Edit)
 "Liquid Dreams" (HQ2 Radio Mix)
 "Take Me Under" (Live Version)
 "We Fit Together"

US 7-inch vinyl
 "All or Nothing" (Radio Edit) — 4:08
 "All or Nothing" (Mike Rizzo Radio Mix) — 3:51

Personnel and credits 
Credits adapted from the liner notes of O-Town.

	
 Erik-Michael Estrada – vocals
 Paul Gendler – guitars
 Matthew Howes – engineer
 Chris Laws – drums, percussion
 Steve Mac – arranger, engineer, keyboards, producer, writer
 Dan Miller – vocals
	
 Richard Niles – string arrangement
 Ashley Parker Angel – vocals
 Steve Pearce – bass
 Trevor Penick – vocals
 Daniel Pursey – engineer
 Jacob Underwood – vocals

Charts

Weekly charts

Year-end charts

Release history

References

2000s ballads
2001 singles
2001 songs
O-Town songs
Bertelsmann Music Group singles
J Records singles
Pop ballads
Song recordings produced by Steve Mac
Songs written by Steve Mac
Songs written by Wayne Hector
Westlife songs